The Beta Hunt Mine is a nickel and gold mine near Kambalda in Western Australia. It is owned and operated by Canadian company Karora Resources through a subsidiary named Salt Lake Mining Pty Ltd. The mining tenement is held by Gold Fields Limited and leased to Salt Lake Mining.

History
The Beta Hunt Mine was originally a nickel mine, exploiting an ore body discovered in 1966. The mine opened in 1973 and produced 153,500 tonnes of nickel metal for WMC Resources by 1998.

The mine was sold to Gold Fields Limited in 2001. Reliance Mining acquired the nickel rights in 2003 and was acquired by Consolidated Minerals in 2005.

The mine was placed into care and maintenance in 2008. It was acquired by Salt Lake Mining in 2013 after that company also secured gold mining rights. It resumed producing nickel in 2014 and started producing gold in November 2015.

In September 2018, a large deposit of gold-bearing quartz rock was discovered in the mine during routine blasting,  underground.

Nickel production is scheduled to resume at the mine from 2022, with Karora Resources aiming to produce up to 550 tonnes of nickel during the year. Nickel had last been produced at the mine in 2018, when 300 tonnes were mined.

Production
Recent annual production of the mine:

Gold

Nickel

References

External links 
 
 MINEDEX website: Kambalda Gold / RNC Database of the Department of Mines, Industry Regulation and Safety

Nickel mines in Western Australia
Gold mines in Western Australia
Shire of Coolgardie
Underground mines in Australia
1973 establishments in Australia